Hajjileh (also Romanized as Ḩājjīleh and Ḩājīleh; also known as Hajieh) is a village in Kenarrudkhaneh Rural District, in the Central District of Golpayegan County, Isfahan Province, Iran. At the 2006 census, its population was 19, in 7 families.

References 

Populated places in Golpayegan County